Ruggero (or Ruggiero)  Leoncavallo (23 April 18579 August 1919) was an Italian opera composer and librettist. Although he produced numerous operas and other songs throughout his career it is his opera Pagliacci (1892) that remained his lasting contribution, despite attempts to escape the shadow of his greatest success.

Today he remains largely known for Pagliacci, one of the most popular and frequently performed works in the opera repertory. His other  compositions include the song "Mattinata", popularized by Enrico Caruso, and the symphonic poem La Nuit de mai.

Biography
The son of Vincenzo Leoncavallo, a police magistrate and judge, Leoncavallo was born in Naples on 23 April 1857.

As a child, Leoncavallo moved with his father to the town of Montalto Uffugo in Calabria, where he lived during his adolescence. He later returned to Naples and was educated at the city's San Pietro a Majella Conservatory and later the University of Bologna studying literature under famed Italian poet Giosuè Carducci.

In 1879, Leoncavallo's uncle Giuseppe, director of the press department at the Foreign Ministry in Egypt, suggested that his young nephew come to Cairo to showcase his pianistic abilities. Arriving shortly after the deposition of Khedive Ismail, Leoncavallo eventually secured work as a piano teacher and pianist to the brother of the new Khedive Tewfik Pasha. His time in Egypt concluded abruptly in 1882 after revolts in Alexandria and Cairo led by ‘Urabi in which the composer quickly departed for France. In Paris, Leoncavallo found lodging in Montmartre.

An agent located in the Rue du Faubourg-Saint-Denis secured Leoncavallo employment as an accompanist and instructor for artists who performed in Sunday concerts mostly at cafés. It was during this time that he met Berthe Rambaud (1869–1926) a "preferred student", who became his wife in 1895. Increasingly inspired by the French romantics, particularly Alfred de Musset, Leoncavallo began work on a symphonic poem based on Musset's poetry entitled La nuit de mai. The work was completed in Paris in 1886 and premiered in April 1887 to critical acclaim. With this success and now with enough accumulated money Leoncavallo and Rambaud would return to Milan to begin his career as a composer of opera.

Back in Italy, Leoncavallo spent some years teaching and attempting ineffectively to obtain the production of more than one opera, notably  Chatterton. In 1890 he saw the enormous success of Pietro Mascagni's Cavalleria rusticana and wasted no time in producing his own verismo work, Pagliacci. (According to Leoncavallo, the plot of this work had a real-life origin: he claimed it derived from a murder trial in Montalto Uffugo, over which his father had presided.)

Pagliacci was performed in Milan in 1892 with immediate success; today it is the only work by Leoncavallo in the standard operatic repertory. Its most famous aria, "Vesti la giubba" ("Put on the costume" or, in the better-known older translation, "On with the motley"), was recorded by Enrico Caruso and laid claim to being the world's first record to sell a million copies (although this is probably a total of Caruso's various versions of it, made in 1902, 1904 and 1907).

The next year his I Medici was also produced in Milan, but neither it nor Chatterton (belatedly produced in 1896)—both early works—obtained much lasting favour. Much of Chatterton, however, was recorded by the Gramophone Company (later HMV) as early as 1908, and remastered on CD almost 100 years later by Marston Records. Leoncavallo himself conducts the performance or at very least supervises the production.

It was not until Leoncavallo's La bohème was performed in 1897 in Venice that his talent obtained public confirmation. However, it was outshone by Puccini's opera of the same name and on the same subject, which was premiered in 1896. Two tenor arias from Leoncavallo's version are still occasionally performed, especially in Italy.

Subsequent operas by Leoncavallo in the 1900s were: Zazà (the opera of Geraldine Farrar's famous 1922 farewell performance at the Metropolitan Opera), and 1904's  Der Roland von Berlin. In 1906 the composer brought singers and orchestral musicians from La Scala to perform concerts of his music in New York, as well as making an extensive tour of the United States. The tour was, all in all, a qualified success. He had a brief success with Zingari, which premiered in Italian in London in 1912, with a long run at the  Hippodrome Theatre. Zingari also reached the United States but soon disappeared from the repertoire.

After a series of operettas, Leoncavallo appeared to have tried for one last serious effort with Edipo re. However, with the publication of Konrad Dryden's biography of Leoncavallo it was revealed that Leoncavallo may not have written the work at all (although it certainly contains themes by Leoncavallo). A review of Dryden's study notes: "That fine Edipo re ... was not even composed by [Leoncavallo]. His widow paid another composer to concoct a new opera using the music of Der Roland von Berlin. Dryden didn't find one reference to the opera in Leoncavallo's correspondence nor is there a single note by him to be found in the handwritten score." Pennacchio may either have concocted the opera or may have had to do more to Leoncavallo's more or less complete work to "fill in the gaps" using Leoncavallo's earlier music.

Death and legacy
Leoncavallo died in Montecatini Terme, Tuscany, on 9 August 1919. His funeral was held two days later, with hundreds in attendance, including fellow composer Pietro Mascagni and longtime rival Giacomo Puccini. He was buried in the Cimitero delle Porte Sante in Florence.

70 years after his death a campaign was launched to move the composer's remains to Brissago, Switzerland, after an alleged letter written by Leoncavallo claimed to show he had desired to be buried there originally, although no such letter was ever found. Leoncavallo became an honorary citizen of Brissago and owned a lavish summer residence, Villa Myriam, in the town; in 1904 the composer had mentioned in a speech that he would not mind having a resting place in the town's Madonna di Porte cemetery, but it was never a written request in his will. Regardless the campaign to move Leoncavallo's remains moved ahead and was granted official approval by Piera Leoncavallo-Grand, the last remaining descendant of the composer. The body was exhumed for transfer to Switzerland along with the remains of his wife Berthe, who died in 1926.

The Museo Leoncavallo (Leoncavallo Museum) was established in 2002 in Brissago to commemorate the composer. It includes personal items and original manuscripts on display as well as statues representing characters from his operas Zazà and Der Roland von Berlin. The Museo Ruggiero Leoncavallo in the composer's childhood home of Montalto Uffugo was opened in 2010 and also contains various manuscripts and personal items, as well as Leoncavallo's personal piano.

Little from Leoncavallo's other operas is heard today, but the baritone arias from Zazà were great concert and recording favourites among baritones and Zazà as a whole is sometimes revived, as is his La bohème. The tenor arias from La bohème remain recording favorites.

Leoncavallo also composed songs, most famously  "Mattinata", which he wrote for the Gramophone Company (which became HMV) with Caruso's unique voice in mind. On 8 April 1904, Leoncavallo accompanied Caruso at the piano as they recorded the song. On 8 December 1905 he recorded five of his own pieces for the reproducing piano Welte-Mignon.

Leoncavallo was the librettist for most of his own operas. Many considered him the greatest Italian librettist of his time after  Boito. Among Leoncavallo's libretti for other composers is his contribution to the libretto for Puccini's  Manon Lescaut.

Operas

 Pagliacci – 21 May 1892, Teatro Dal Verme, Milan.
I Medici – 9 November 1893, Teatro Dal Verme, Milan). (The first part of the uncompleted trilogy, Crepusculum.)
Chatterton – 10 March 1896, Teatro Argentina, Rome. (Revision of a work written in 1876.)
La bohème – 6 May 1897, Teatro La Fenice, Venice.
Zazà – 10 November 1900, Teatro Lirico, Milan.
Der Roland von Berlin – 13 December 1904, Königliches Opernhaus, Berlin.
Maïa – 15 January 1910, Teatro Costanzi, Rome.
Zingari – 16 September 1912, Hippodrome, London.
Mimi Pinson – 1913, Teatro Massimo, Palermo. (Revision of La bohème.)
Mameli – 27 April 1916, Teatro Carlo Felice, Genoa. (Note that the Fondazione Leoncavallo classes this as an opera rather than an operetta.)
Edipo re – 13 December 1920, Chicago Opera. (Produced after the composer's death, at very least orchestration not by Leoncavallo, completed or perhaps composed by Giovanni Pennacchio.)

Operettas

La jeunesse de Figaro – 1906, United States.
Malbrouck – 19 January 1910, Teatro Nazionale, Rome.
La reginetta delle rose – 24 June 1912, Teatro Costanzi, Rome.
Are You There? – 1 November 1913, Prince of Wales Theatre, London.
La candidata – 6 February 1915, Teatro Nazionale, Rome.
Prestami tua moglie – 2 September 1916, Casino delle Terme, Montecatini. (English title: Lend me your wife.)
Goffredo Mameli  – 27 April 1916, Teatro Carlo Felice, Genoa. 
 A chi la giarrettiera? – 16 October 1919, Teatro Adriano, Rome. (English title: Whose Garter Is This?) Produced after the composer's death.
Il primo bacio – 29 April 1923 Salone di cura, Montecatini. Produced after the composer's death.
La maschera nuda  – 26 June 1925 Teatro Politeama, Naples. Produced after the composer's death.

Other works
La nuit de mai – poème symphonique for tenor and orchestra after Alfred de Musset, Paris 1886 (also performed and recorded in 1990 and – with Plácido Domingo – in 2010)
Séraphitus Séraphita – Poema Sinfonico after Honoré de Balzac, Teatro alla Scala, Milan 1894

Bibliography
Dryden, Konrad (2007). Leoncavallo: Life and Works, Scarecrow Press. 
 Jürgen Maehder/Lorenza Guiot (eds.), Ruggero Leoncavallo nel suo tempo. Atti del I° Convegno Internazionale di Studi su Leoncavallo a Locarno 1991, Milan (Sonzogno) 1993.
 Jürgen Maehder/Lorenza Guiot (eds.), Letteratura, musica e teatro al tempo di Ruggero Leoncavallo. Atti del II° Convegno Internazionale di Studi su Leoncavallo a Locarno 1993, Milan (Sonzogno) 1995.
 Jürgen Maehder/Lorenza Guiot (eds.), Nazionalismo e cosmopolitismo nell'opera tra '800 e '900. Atti del III° Convegno Internazionale di Studi su Leoncavallo a Locarno 1995, Milan (Sonzogno) 1998.
 Jürgen Maehder/Lorenza Guiot (eds.), Tendenze della musica teatrale italiana all'inizio del Novecento. Atti del IV° Convegno Internazionale di Studi su Leoncavallo a Locarno 1998, Milan (Sonzogno) 2005.
Rosenthal, H. and Warrack, J. (eds.) (1979). "Leoncavallo, Ruggero", The Concise Oxford Dictionary of Opera, 2nd Edition, pp. 278–279. Oxford University Press. 
Sadie, Stanley and Bashford, Christina (eds.) (1992). "Leoncavallo, Ruggero [Ruggiero]", The New Grove Dictionary of Opera, pp. 1148–1149. Macmillan.

Notes

References

External links 

Festival Leoncavallo Montalto Uffugo 
Fondazione Ruggero Leoncavallo 
List of modern recordings of I Medici Festival Di Francoforte, 10 September 2003 (Bruson, Giacomini, et al., Cond.Viotti)
Zingari in Philadelphia, (Chicago Opera Company, 1912)

Museo Leoncavallo, Brissago
Fondo Leoncavallo, Locarno
La Candidata | operetta in 3 atti e 4 quadri, 1915 publication, Italian, digitized by BYU on archive.org

1857 births
1919 deaths
19th-century classical composers
19th-century Italian male musicians
20th-century classical composers
20th-century Italian composers
20th-century Italian male musicians
Italian classical composers
Italian male classical composers
Italian opera composers
Italian Romantic composers
Male opera composers
Musicians from Naples